Majik may refer to:
J Majik, English DJ
Majik Records, record label
MAJIK BAND, American Rock Band
Majik Band Productions, record label
Majik Ninja Entertainment, record label
Monkey Majik, Japanese band
"Majik of Majiks", song by Cat Stevens
Don Majkowski